Trouble is a 1977 Soviet drama film directed by Dinara Asanova.

Plot 
The film tells about a weak but good person who starts drinking and as a result loses his job, family and commits a crime.

Cast 
 Aleksey Petrenko as Vyacheslav Kuligin
 Yelena Kuzmina as Alevtina Ivanovna
 Lidiya Fedoseeva-Shukshina as Zinaida
 Georgiy Burkov as Nikolay Maslakov
 Gennadi Dyudyayev as Gusev
 Fyodor Odinokov as Uncle Kohl
 Mariya Vinogradova as Klava

References

External links 
 

1977 films
1970s Russian-language films
Soviet drama films
1977 drama films